Best of the Cowboy Junkies is a 2001 greatest hits compilation of Cowboy Junkies' songs recorded for RCA Records. All songs are drawn from the band's RCA Records albums: The Trinity Session, The Caution Horses, Black Eyed Man and Pale Sun, Crescent Moon.

Track listing

Fan reception 
RCA assembled this greatest hits album without participation with the band, using the albums in the RCA catalog. Junkies fan sites suggest boycotting the album, and support the purchasing Waltz Across America instead.

References

External links 

2001 greatest hits albums
Cowboy Junkies albums
RCA Records compilation albums